Mann Mountain Settlement is an unincorporated community in Restigouche County, New Brunswick, Canada.

The local service district of Mann Mountain takes its name from this community.

History

Notable people

See also
List of communities in New Brunswick

References

Communities in Restigouche County, New Brunswick
Local service districts of Restigouche County, New Brunswick